The 170th Pennsylvania House of Representatives District is located in  Philadelphia County and includes the following areas:

 Ward 58 [PART, Divisions 01, 02, 03, 04, 05, 06, 07, 08, 12, 14, 15, 18, 20, 21, 22, 23, 24, 25, 27, 29, 30, 31, 32, 33, 34, 35, 36, 37, 38, 39, 40, 41, 42, 43 and 44]
 Ward 66 [PART, Divisions 01, 03, 04, 05, 06, 08, 09, 10, 12, 13, 14, 15, 16, 18, 20, 22, 23, 31, 33, 34, 38, 39, 40 and 41]

Special Election

A Special Election for the 170th House District was ordered for Tuesday, March 24, 2015.

Republican candidate Martina White was nominated by Republican ward leaders in the district, and went on to win the special election, with a 14% margin over Democrat Sarah Del Ricci.

Representatives

References

External links
Map of PA District 170

Government of Philadelphia
170